Chastenuel, part of the commune of Jax, is a village in the Haute-Loire département of France. The village is the location of a riding school, the Centre Equestre de Jax.

Geography of Haute-Loire